Ramón Otero Pedrayo (alternative spelling Outeiro Pedraio) (Ourense, Galicia, 1888 - Ourense, 1976) was a Galician geographer, writer and intellectual. He was a key member of the Galician cultural and political movement Xeración Nós.

Biography

Otero Pedrayo taught Geography and History in Burgos and Santander (Spain), before he went back to his natal city of Ourense. In 1918 he becomes a member of the Galicianist organisation Irmandades da Fala. He was a member of the Spanish parliament during the time of the Spanish Second Republic representing the Partido Galeguista (Galicianist Party) and the Republican Nationalist Party of Ourense.

He was the first professor of Geography at the University of Santiago de Compostela. Apart from being considered the person who first introduced modern Geography in Galicia, he also was an accomplished writer as he demonstrates in his numerous essays, novels, plays and poems. He was also renowned as a great orator with a charismatic voice . In 1933, he addressed a speech at a rally during the Basque Fatherland Day organized by the Basque Nationalist Party at San Sebastián, Gipuzkoa (picture above).

Some of his famous novels are Os camiños da vida and O mesón dos Ermos, where he provides a meticulous description of Galician rural life. In fact, his non-scientific works are often taken as historical sources, since they are quite accurate and rigorous in terms of localization, description and context. It must also be mentioned Arredor de si, a novel often considered to be a veiled autobiography.

Among his vast scientific production the encyclopaedia Historia de Galiza (first published in 1962) stands out as a colossal project. Yet, in his many works he depicts with precision the history, geography, folklore and anthropology of Galicia. He is the first geographer to define Galicia as an Atlantic country, that is, of Atlantic and not Mediterranean culture. And together with archaeologist Florentino López Cuevillas he is one of the first researchers embarking in a systematic scientific study of Galicia's Celtic past.

There is a foundation named after him, which preserves and promotes his works .

Partial bibliography

(in Galician)

Pantelas, home libre (short stories) (1925)
O purgatorio de don Ramiro (short stories) (1926)
Síntesis xeográfica de Galicia (geography) (1926)
Escrito na néboa (short stories) (1927)
Os camiños da vida (novel in three books) (1928)
A lagarada (theatre play) (1928)
Arredor de si (novel) (1930)
Contos do camiño e da rúa (short stories) (1932) 
Fra Vernero (novel) (1934)
Teatro de máscaras (theatre play) (1934)
Devalar (novel) (1935)
O mesón dos ermos (short stories) (1936)
O desengano do prioiro (theatre play) (1952)
Entre a vendima e a castiñeira (short stories) (1957)
Bocarribeira. Poemas pra ler e queimar (poetry) (1958) 
Rosalía (theatre dialogues) (1959)
O señorito da Reboraina (novel) (1960)
Historia de Galiza (historical/geographical encyclopaedia, 1962)
Síntesis histórica do século XVIII en Galicia (history) (1969)
O fidalgo e a noite (theatre dialogues) (1970) 
Noite compostelá (theatre dialogues) (1973)
O Maroutallo (short stories) (1974)
Os rios galegos (geography) (1976)

(in Spanish)
Guia de Galicia (geography) (1926)
Paisajes y problemas geográficos de Galicia (geography) (1928)
Historia de la cultura gallega (history/anthropology) (1939)
Las palmas del convento (novel) (1941).
Vida del Doctor Don Marcelo Macías y García (novel) (1943)
Adolescencia (novel) (1944).
La vocación de Adrián Silva (novel) (1949).
Las ciudades gallegas (geography) (1955)
Geografía de España: presencia y potencia del suelo y del pueblo español (geography) (1955)
Galicia: una cultura de Occidente (geography) (1975)

External links
Fundación Otero Pedrayo
Profile at the Biblioteca da Cultura Galega (in Galician)
Otero Pedrayo giving a speech

See also
Atlantic Europe
Partido Galeguista (1931)
Galician Statute of Autonomy (1936)
Galicianism (Galicia)
Xeración Nós
University of Santiago de Compostela
Celts in Galicia (Castro culture)

1888 births
1976 deaths
People from Ourense
Partido Galeguista (1931) politicians
Members of the Congress of Deputies of the Second Spanish Republic
Spanish geographers
Writers from Galicia (Spain)
Galician-language writers
20th-century geographers